Mionica may refer to the following places:

Bosnia and Herzegovina
 Mionica (Gradačac), village in the municipality of Gradačac

Serbia
 Mionica, town and municipality located in the Kolubara District
 Mionica (village), village situated in Mionica municipality
 Mionica (Kosjerić), village in the municipality of Kosjerić